Margaret Sale Covey Chisholm  (July 6, 1909 – January 24, 1965) was an American portrait painter and muralist who painted the mural for the Livingston, Tennessee post office as part of the WPA artist project during the Great Depression. Her works are held in numerous public and private collections.

Early years
Margaret Sale Covey was born on July 6, 1909 in Englewood, New Jersey to muralist Arthur Covey and Mary Dorothea Sale. Her stepmother was award-winning children's author and illustrator Lois Lenski. She was a student at the Art Students League in New York City and later studied at the Pennsylvania Academy of the Fine Arts under the tutelage of N. C. Wyeth. After a year studying art at the School of Fine Arts in Fontainebleau, France, she went on to study and graduate with a degree in fine art from Yale University. Her teachers included Anne Goldthwaite and Leon Kroll.

Work
Covey was commissioned by the Federal Art Project to paint a mural, The Newcomers, for the post office in  Livingston, Tennessee, which she did in 1940. She also painted a mural at the Ferncliff Mausoleum in Hartsdale, Westchester County, New York. She exhibited in solo shows from Connecticut to Washington, D.C. and won awards from the New Rochelle Art Association, the Westchester Art Society and the Westchester Arts and Crafts Guild. In addition to working as an artist, she taught at the Rehabilitation Center in Fort Slocum.

She later married Robert K. Chisholm, an architect, and made her home in Pleasantville, New York where she gave art classes at her home and at the Pleasantville High School for adult education classes Her "work is in many public and private collections."

References

Citations

Bibliography

1909 births
20th-century American women artists
American muralists
20th-century American painters
American women painters
Art Students League of New York alumni
Pennsylvania Academy of the Fine Arts alumni
1965 deaths
Women muralists